Integral membrane protein GPR155, also known as G protein-coupled receptor 155, is a protein that in humans is encoded by the GPR155 gene. Mutations in this gene may be associated with autism.

References

Further reading

G protein-coupled receptors